Bedford Greenacre Independent School is a co-educational private day school located in Bedford, Bedfordshire, England.

The school was formally created in May 2021 from a merger of Rushmoor School and St Andrew's School.

History

Rushmoor School 
Rushmoor School was founded in the early 1910s and was originally a privately run school based in London. It educated children of the ages of 8–13. In 1918, the school moved from London to a site on Shakespeare Road in Bedford. In 1965, the owner announced her retirement and the closure of the school, however, a group of parents and friends persuaded her to allow them to take over the running of the school and thus, the school became 'Rushmoor School Ltd', a charitable trust administered by a board of governors. The school then expanded considerably; it became partially co-educational, accepting children of the ages of 3–16.

St Andrew's School 
St Andrews School was founded in 1896 as a school for the daughters of gentlemen. Located on Kimbolton Road in Bedford, before the federation and merger the school consisted of a nursery, reception class, junior school and senior school educating  girls aged 3–16 and boys aged 3–9.

Federation and merger 
In September 2013 Rushmoor School and St Andrew's School entered into a federation. Both schools retained their own identity and governing body, but shared resources and had one principal. In September 2016 both schools opened a combined sixth form.

In early 2014, the schools released plans to move to a combined site on the edge of Bedford. The new site utilises the current sports field for development. The plans will see girls and boys educated on the same site in a Diamond school system. In May 2021 the two schools formally merged under the new name of 'Bedford Greenacre Independent School'. The merged school is expected to relocate to the new site in 2022. A combined nursery school will be retained on the former St Andrews School site on Kimbolton Road.

References

External links 
 Bedford Greenacre Independent School official website

Private schools in the Borough of Bedford
Schools in Bedford
Diamond schools